The following is a list of FCC-licensed radio stations in the U.S. state of Kansas, which can be sorted by their call signs, frequencies, cities of license, licensees, and programming formats.

List of radio stations

Defunct 
 KNJT

References 

 
Kansas
Radio